The Daya Bay Reactor Neutrino Experiment is a China-based multinational particle physics project studying neutrinos.  The multinational collaboration includes researchers from China, Chile, the United States, Taiwan (Republic of China), Russia, and the Czech Republic.  The US side of the project is funded by the US Department of Energy's Office of High Energy Physics.

It is situated at Daya Bay, approximately 52 kilometers northeast of Hong Kong and 45 kilometers east of Shenzhen. There is an affiliated project in the Aberdeen Tunnel Underground Laboratory in Hong Kong. The Aberdeen lab measures the neutrons produced by cosmic muons which may affect the Daya Bay Reactor Neutrino Experiment.

The experiment consists of eight antineutrino detectors, clustered in three locations within  of six nuclear reactors. Each detector consists of 20 tons of liquid scintillator (linear alkylbenzene doped with gadolinium) surrounded by photomultiplier tubes and shielding.

A much larger follow-up is in development in the form of the Jiangmen Underground Neutrino Observatory (JUNO) in Kaiping, which will use an acrylic sphere filled with 20,000 tons of liquid scintillator to detect reactor antineutrinos. Groundbreaking began 10 January 2015, with operation expected in 2020.

Neutrino oscillations
The experiment studies neutrino oscillations and is designed to measure the mixing angle θ13 using antineutrinos produced by the reactors of the Daya Bay Nuclear Power Plant and the Ling Ao Nuclear Power Plant. Scientists are also interested in whether neutrinos violate Charge-Parity conservation.

On 8 March 2012, the Daya Bay collaboration announced a 5.2σ discovery of θ13 ≠ 0, with
 

This significant result represents a new type of oscillation and is surprisingly large. It is consistent with earlier, less significant results by T2K, MINOS and Double Chooz. With θ13 so large, NOνA has about a 50% probability of being sensitive to the neutrino mass hierarchy. Experiments may also be able to probe CP violation among neutrinos.

The collaboration produced an updated analysis of their results in 2014, which used the energy spectrum to improve the bounds on the mixing angle:
 

An independent measurement was also published using events from neutrons captured on hydrogen:
.

Daya Bay has used its data to search for signals of a light sterile neutrino, resulting in exclusions of some previous unexplored mass regions.

At the Moriond 2015 physics conference a new best fit for mixing angle and mass difference was presented:

Antineutrino spectrum 
Daya Bay Collaboration measured the anti-neutrino energy spectrum, and found that anti-neutrinos at an energy of around 5 MeV are in excess relative to theoretical expectations. This unexpected disagreement between observation and predictions suggested that the Standard model of particle physics needs improvement.

See also
 Neutrino
 Sterile neutrino
 Weak interaction

External links

Collaborators

References

Reactor neutrino experiments
Science and technology in the People's Republic of China
Nuclear technology in China
Underground laboratories